The 1997 Tashkent Open was a men's tennis tournament held in Tashkent, Uzbekistan and played on outdoor hard courts. It was the inaugural edition of the tournament, part of the 1997 ATP Tour, and was held from September 8 to September 15.

Tim Henman defeated Marc Rosset 7–6(7–2), 6–4 in the final to secure the title.

Seeds
The text in italics indicates the round in which that seed was eliminated.

Draws

Finals

Top half

Bottom half

References

External links
 Main draw

1997 Singles
1997 ATP Tour